Tereza Medveďová (born 27 March 1996) is a Slovak professional racing cyclist, who most recently rode for UCI Women's Continental Team .

Major results

Cyclo-cross

2009
 1st Horná Mičiná Cyclo-cross #1
 1st Borová Cyclo-cross
 1st Banská Bystrica Cyclo-cross
 1st Hlinsko Cyclo-cross
 2nd Plzeň Cyclo-cross
 2nd Zelenec Cyclo-cross
 2nd Holé Vrchy Cyclo-cross
 2nd Trnava Cyclo-cross
 2nd Vrícko Cyclo-cross
2010
 1st  National Cyclo-cross Championships
 1st Overall Slovenský Pohár Cyclo-cross
1st Borová
1st Zelenec
1st Trnava
2nd Horná Mičiná
2nd Raková
2nd Petržalka
2nd Kremnica
 1st Louny Cyclo-cross
 1st Uničov Cyclo-cross
 1st Plzeň Cyclo-cross
 1st Kolín Cyclo-cross
 2nd Stříbro Cyclo-cross
2011
 1st  National Cyclo-cross Championships
 1st Overall Slovenský Pohár Cyclo-cross
1st Horná Mičiná
1st Bratislava
1st Miezgovce
1st Spišská Nová Ves #1
1st Spišská Nová Ves #2
1st Krupina
1st Trenčín
1st Trnava
2nd Borová
2nd Raková
 1st Loštice Cyclo-cross
 2nd Stříbro Cyclo-cross
 2nd Mnichovo Hradiště Cyclo-cross
 3rd Louny Cyclo-cross
2012
 1st Overall Slovenský Pohár Cyclo-cross
1st Prosné #1
1st Prosné #2
1st Horná Mičiná #1
1st Borová
1st Bánovce nad Bebravou
1st Trenčín
1st Trnava #1
2nd Dubnica nad Váhom
 2nd National Cyclo-cross Championships
 3rd Kolín Cyclo-cross
2013
 1st  National Cyclo-cross Championships
 1st Overall Slovenský Pohár Cyclo-cross
1st Prosné #1
1st Svit
1st Levoča
1st Bratislava #1
1st Horná Mičiná #1
1st Stará Ľubovňa
1st Trnava #1
1st Krupina
2nd Prosné #2
2014
 1st  National Cyclo-cross Championships
 1st Overall Slovenský Pohár Cyclo-cross
1st Raková
1st Ružomberok
2nd Levoča
2nd Spišská Sobota
2015
 1st Levoča Cyclo-cross
 1st Spišská Sobota
 1st Ružomberok Cyclo-cross
2016
 1st Bánovce nad Bebravou Cyclo-cross
 1st Terchová Cyclo-cross
 1st Levoča Cyclo-cross
 1st Horná Mičiná #1
2017
 2nd National Cyclo-cross Championships
 3rd Overall Slovenský Pohár

Road
Source: 

2011
 National Novices Road Championships
1st  Road race
1st  Time trial
2013
 1st  Time trial, National Junior Road Championships
 6th Road race, UCI Junior Road World Championships
2014
 National Junior Road Championships
1st  Time trial
1st  Road race
2015
 National Road Championships
1st  Time trial
2nd Road race
2016
 3rd Road race, National Road Championships
 6th Overall Tour de Bretagne Féminin
2017
 National Road Championships
3rd Time trial
3rd Road race
2018
 1st  Road race, National Road Championships
2019
 2nd Road race, National Road Championships
2020
 National Road Championships
1st  Time trial
1st  Road race
2021
 1st  Road race, National Road Championships
2022
 3rd Road race, National Road Championships

Track

2018
 National Track Championships
1st  500m time trial
1st  Individual pursuit
2nd Scratch
3rd Omnium
2019
 National Track Championships
1st  500m time trial
1st  Individual pursuit
2nd Scratch
2nd Points race
2nd Omnium
2020
 National Track Championships
1st  500m time trial
1st  Individual pursuit
3rd Elimination race

See also
 List of 2015 UCI Women's Teams and riders

References

External links

1996 births
Living people
Slovak female cyclists
Sportspeople from Brezno
Cyclists at the 2015 European Games
European Games competitors for Slovakia
Cyclists at the 2019 European Games